The 1910–11 Sheffield Shield season was the 19th season of the Sheffield Shield, the domestic first-class cricket competition of Australia. New South Wales won the championship after being awarded the title with a better quotient. One fixture between South Australia and New South Wales was not held.

Table

Statistics

Most Runs
Warren Bardsley 463

Most Wickets
Warwick Armstrong & Frank Laver 17

References

Sheffield Shield
Sheffield Shield
Sheffield Shield seasons